The Suitcase is a novel by Sergei Dovlatov, published in Russian in 1986 and in English translation by Antonina W. Bouis in 1990. Although loosely connected into a novel, The Suitcase is a collection of eight stories of life in the Soviet Union based on eight items brought in the author's suitcase from the USSR to exile in the US in 1978.

References

1986 Russian novels
Novels by Sergei Dovlatov